Love and Anger may refer to:

 "Love and Anger" (song), a 1989 song by Kate Bush
 Love and Anger (film), a 1969 anthology film
 Love and Anger (play), a 1989 play by George F. Walker